State Route 254 (SR 254) is a primary state highway in the U.S. state of Virginia. The state highway runs  from SR 42 near Buffalo Gap east to U.S. Route 340 (US 340) in Waynesboro. SR 254 provides a northerly alternate route to US 250 between Waynesboro and Staunton, where the highway provides access to the Woodrow Wilson Presidential Library.

Route description

SR 254 begins at an intersection with SR 42 in the hamlet of Buffalo Gap. SR 42 heads west as Parkersburg Turnpike through the namesake water gap in Little North Mountain, and north as Buffalo Gap Highway. SR 254 heads east as two-lane undivided Parkersburg Turnpike, which crosses the Middle River and enters the city of Staunton at its diamond interchange with SR 262 (Woodrow Wilson Parkway). The state highway continues as Beverley Street toward downtown Staunton, where the highway splits into a one-way pair, Beverley Street eastbound and Frederick Street westbound. SR 254 soon intersects US 250 and US 11 Business, which follow Augusta Street south and New Street north. SR 254 passes the American Shakespeare Center, Mary Baldwin College, and the Woodrow Wilson Presidential Library in the eastern part of downtown. The one-way pair concludes at Coalter Street, which westbound SR 254 uses to reach Frederick Street. Beverley Street continues east to the Virginia School for the Deaf and the Blind campus while the state highway turns south onto Coalter Street.

Two blocks to the south, SR 254 has a four-way intersection with US 11, US 250, and US 11 Business, for which the intersection serves as its southern terminus. US 250 and US 11 Business head west on Greenville Street, US 11 and US 250 head south on Greenville Street underneath CSX's North Mountain Subdivision, and SR 254 and US 11 head east on Commerce Road, a four-lane divided highway. The two highways parallel the railroad to New Hope Road; SR 254 leaves US 11 via a two-way ramp to join New Hope Road, which passes under both US 11 and the railroad. SR 254 intersects SR 261 (Statler Boulevard) and leaves of its overpass of Interstate 81. The state highway veers northeast to meet the northern terminus of SR 262 (Woodrow Wilson Boulevard). SR 254 continues east as Hermitage Road, which crosses Christians Creek and gradually curves southeast and south to the city of Waynesboro. The state highway enters the city as Ivy Street, then turns south onto Poplar Street and has a grade crossing of the CSX rail line. SR 254 intersects US 250 (Broad Street) one block north of its eastern terminus at US 340 (Main Street) at the west end of downtown Waynesboro.

Major intersections

References

External links

Virginia Highways Project: VA 254

254
State Route 254
State Route 254
State Route 254